Events from the year 1498 in France

Incumbents
 Monarch – Charles VIII (until April 7), then Louis XII

Events
27 May – Coronation of Louis XII

Births

Full date missing
Madeleine de La Tour d'Auvergne (died 1519)
François de Dinteville, bishop (died 1530)

Deaths

7 April – Charles VIII of France (born 1470).

References

Links

1490s in France